Anne Marie Palli (born 18 April 1955) is a French professional golfer who played on the LPGA Tour.

Palli represented her country seven years in a row at the European Lady Junior's Team Championship, for players up to the age of 21, winning four times with her team and three times (1973, 1974 and 1976) individually.

16 years old, she made her debut at the European Ladies' Team Championship in 1971 at Ganton Golf Club, England, earning a silver medal with her team, after France lost in the final against the host nation.

Palli won twice on the LPGA Tour, in 1983 and 1992.

Professional wins

LPGA Tour wins (2)

LPGA Tour playoff record (1–0)

Other wins (1)
 1982 Dodger Pines Ladies Classic

Team appearances
Amateur
 European Lady Junior's Team Championship  (representing France): 1970 (winners), 1971 (winners), 1972, 1973 (winners), 1974 (winners), 1975, 1976
 European Ladies' Team Championship (representing France): 1971, 1973, 1975
 Espirito Santo Trophy (representing France): 1972, 1976

Professional
 Handa Cup (representing World team): 2006, 2007, 2008, 2009, 2010, 2011, 2012 (tie)

References

External links
 
 

French female golfers
LPGA Tour golfers
People from Labourd
Sportspeople from Pyrénées-Atlantiques
Golfers from Scottsdale, Arizona
1955 births
Living people